The International Union of Biological Sciences (IUBS) is a non-profit organization and non-governmental organization, founded in 1919, that promotes the biological sciences internationally. As a scientific umbrella organization it was a founding member of the International Council for Science (ICSU).

Objectives 
The union has several key objectives:
 to promote the study of biological sciences;
 to initiate, facilitate and coordinate research and other scientific activities necessitating international, interdisciplinary cooperation;
 to ensure the discussion and dissemination of the results of cooperative research, particularly in connection with IUBS scientific programmes;
 to support the organisation of international conferences and assist in the publication of their reports.

Networking and cooperation 
The Union was a founding member of the ICSU Scientific Committee and works closely with UNESCO. It also maintains relations with the World Health Organization (WHO), the Food and Agriculture Organization (FAO) and the United Nations Environment Programme (UNEP). It cooperates with the European Commission and numerous other organizations, agencies and foundations.

Organisation 
The Union currently consists of:
 44 national members, consisting of national science academies, research and scientific organizations,
 80 scientific members, including international scientific associations, societies or commissions of the various biological disciplines, from biology to zoology. New members are allowed under strict scientific guidelines.

The national and the academic members identify promising areas of biological science and bring them to the attention of the Union and in the reverse, promote the programs of the Union in their own country to stimulate research projects. The Union reviews the member's suggestions, checks them against the international academic and scientific-political background and develops the programs, if they have sufficient support. Approval is given in the General Assembly and the project progresses through international conferences for accreditation and then implementation through national or international funding agencies.

Board 
The Executive Committee consists of: the President, the former president, two Vice-Presidents, the Secretary, the Treasurer and other members of the Extended Board. The Board meets annually. The Secretariat, with its Executive Director coordinates the programs and activities.

General Assembly 
In the General Assembly, each national member has one vote. The scientific members are invited to send one representative each to the talks and make programmatic proposals. The General Assembly elects the Executive Board for the proposed projects, selects the scientific programs of the Union, reviews the progress of scientific programs, collaborates with other international organizations and decides on the allocation of funding. The General Assembly takes place in parallel to a scientific conference, organized in cooperation with the National Union Committee of the host country.

Programmes 
The scientific programmes of the General Assembly are approved in accordance with the Statutes of the Union. Where necessary and possible, the EU has granted start-up funding for individual programs, that supports the further funding from national or international donors or by negotiated agreements with the Union.

Examples of programmes 
Diversitas, Human Dimensions of Biodiversity, Climate Change Integrative Biology (ICCB), Systematics Agenda, Biological Education (BioED), IUBS Bioethics Ethics Committee earlier, Bionomenclature, Biology and Traditional Knowledge, Biological Consequences of Global Change (BCGC) Darwin200, Biosystematics, Species 2000, Genomics and Evolution, Modernizing the codes to meet future needs of scientific communities (Biocode), Biology Research and Education Resources in Africa, Reproductive Biology, Aquaculture, Bio-Energy and Towards an Integrative Biology (TAIB), Global Species List Working Group (GSLWG).

Publications 
The institution publishes four times a year Biology International and other publications such as IUBS Monograph Series, Methodology Manual Series and the Proceedings of the IUBS General Assemblies.

Legal status and finance 
The International Union of Biological Sciences is non-profit and does not pursue economic goals. It is funded from the following sources:
 annual dues of full members;
 assistance received from UNESCO and other international organizations that support the scientific programs of the Union;
 other sources

The activities of the Union are within an annual budget of about 340,000, - € (2006). Of these, the salaries of a director and a secretary are paid, who run the Union's office in Paris. All other offices (President, Secretary General, Treasurer, etc.) are honorary offices for which only the direct expenses will be paid for.

History 
The Union was founded in 1919 following the work of the Conference of Allied Academies of Sciences held in Brussels. Originally the 'S' was not for science but for Societies. 
After defining its constitution and organization in 1925, the IUBS adheres to the International Research Council (International Council for Science), which is now known by the acronym ICSU (International Council of Scientific Unions).
From 1925 to 1939, the IUBS worked on two main themes: information science and the environment. This second project resulted in the creation of the World Conservation Union or IUCN.
After being dormant for 1935 to 1949, the IUCB developed a highly original program of international research:
 In the eighties, it developed a number of scientific programs, such as the Decade of the Tropics, bioindicators, biological complexity and biodiversity.
 Since the 2000s the organization has been working on various projects: Diversity, Biosystematics, Species 2000 and Bionomenclature.

See also 
 Academy of Sciences

External links
 Official International Union of Biological Sciences−IUBS website

Programmes of the IUBS
 Bioethics 
 Diversitas 
 Biological education

Biology organizations
International scientific organizations
Scientific supraorganizations
Members of the International Council for Science
Organizations based in Paris
Scientific organizations based in France
Scientific organizations established in 1919
Members of the International Science Council